Tututni (Dotodəni, alternatively "Tutudin"), also known as Upper Coquille, (Lower) Rogue River and Nuu-wee-ya, is an Athabaskan language once spoken by three Tututni (Lower Rogue River Athabaskan) tribes: Tututni tribe (including Euchre Creek band), Coquille tribe, and Chasta Costa tribe who are part of the Rogue River Indian peoples of southwestern Oregon.  In 2006 students at Linfield College participated in a project to "revitalize the language." It is one of the four languages belonging to the Oregon Athabaskan cluster of the Pacific Coast Athabaskan languages.

Dialects were Coquille (Upper Coquille, Mishikhwutmetunee), spoken along the upper Coquille River; Tututni (Tututunne, Naltunnetunne, Mikonotunne, Kwatami, Chemetunne, Chetleshin, Khwaishtunnetunnne); Euchre Creek, and Chasta Costa (Illinois River, Šista Qʼʷə́sta).

Phonology
The following lists the consonant and vowel sounds in the Tututni language:

References

Further reading 
Golla, Victor K. "Tututni (Oregon Athapascan)." International Journal of American Linguistics 42 (1976): 217-227.

External links 
OLAC resources in and about the Coquille language
resources in and about the Tututni language
Chasta Costa at the California Language Archive
Tututni at the California Language Archive
Upper Coquille at the California Language Archive

Pacific Coast Athabaskan languages
Extinct languages of North America
Languages extinct in the 1980s
1983 disestablishments in Oregon
Tututni